Indianapolis Metropolitan Airport  is a public airport in Fishers, Hamilton County, Indiana, United States.

Most U.S. airports use the same three-letter location identifier for the FAA and IATA, but Indianapolis Metropolitan Airport is "UMP" to the FAA and has no IATA code.

Facilities and aircraft 

For the year ending December 31, 2016, the airport had 24,590 aircraft operations, an average of 67 per day: 80% general aviation, 17% air taxi and 3% military. In June 2018, there were 111 aircraft based at this airport: 90 single-engine, 10 multi-engine, 5 jet and 6 helicopter.

Tom Wood Aviation is the FBO (fixed-base operator), with full-service Shell fueling of 100LL and Jet-A, FAA certified aircraft charter, full service aircraft management, pilot service, flight instruction, aircraft repair, maintenance and alterations, and aircraft sales. The facilities include coffee, ice, pilots' lounge with TV, executive conference rooms, public restrooms, catering services and more. Rental vehicles are available through Tom Wood Nissan, Hertz and Enterprise.

References

External links 

 Indianapolis Metropolitan Airport, official page from Indianapolis Airport Authority
 Tom Wood Aviation, Inc., the fixed-base operator (FBO)
 Aerial photo from Indiana Department of Transportation
 
 

Airports in Indiana
Transportation in Indianapolis
Transportation buildings and structures in Hamilton County, Indiana